Argentina competed at the 2015 World Aquatics Championships in Kazan, Russia from 24 July to 9 August.

Medalists

Open water swimming

Argentina fielded a full team of four swimmers to compete in the open water marathon.

Swimming

Argentine swimmers achieved qualifying standards in the following events (up to a maximum of 2 swimmers in each event at the A-standard entry time, and 1 at the B-standard):

Men

Women

Synchronized swimming

Argentina qualified two synchronized swimmers to compete in each of the following events.

Water polo

Men's tournament

Team roster

Diego Malnero
Ramiro Veich
Tomás Galimberti
Andrés Monutti
Emanuel López
Tomás Bulgheroni
Juan Pablo Montané
Esteban Corsi
Iván Carabantes
Julián Daszczyk
Franco Demarchi
Germán Yañez
Franco Testa

Group play

13th–16th place semifinals

15th place game

References

External links
Confederación Argentina de Deportes Acuáticos 

Nations at the 2015 World Aquatics Championships
2015
World Aquatics Championships